HJV may refer to:

Home Guard (Denmark) (Hjemmeværnet)
Hemojuvelin
Highlands J virus